Father Cleopa Ilie (10 April 1912 – 2 December 1998) was an abbot of the Sihăstria Monastery. He was a well-known spiritual representative of the Romanian Orthodox Church.

Biography
Cleopa Ilie (lay name: Constantin) was born in Sulița, Botoșani to a family of peasants. He was the fifth of ten children born to Alexandru Ilie. He attended the primary school in his village. Afterwards he was an apprentice for three years to the monk Paisie Olaru, who lived in seclusion at the Cozancea hermitage.

Together with his elder brother, Vasile, Ilie joined the community at Sihastria hermitage in December 1929. In 1935, he joined the army in the town of Botoșani, but returned a year later to the hermitage, where he was anointed a monk on 2 August 1937, taking the name "Cleopa" (i.e. "guide") at his baptism. In June 1942, he was appointed to hegumen deputy because of abbot Ioanichie Moroi's poor health.

On 27 December 1944, he was ordained a hierodeacon (deacon-monk) and on 23 January 1945 a hieromonk (priest-monk) by the archbishop Galaction Cordun, abbot of the Neamţ Monastery at the time. Afterwards he was officially appointed hegumen of the Sihastria Hermitage.

In 1947, the hermitage became a monastery and vice-archimandrite Cleopa Ilie became archimandrite on approval of Patriarch Nicodim. Because the Communist secret service was looking for him in 1948, he disappeared into the woods surrounding the monastery, staying there for six months. On 30 August 1949, he was appointed abbot of the Slatina Monastery in Suceava county, where he joined 30 other monks from the Sihastria Monastery community as a result of Patriarch Justinian's decision.

There he founded a community of monks with over 80 people. Between 1952 and 1954 he was being chased again by the Securitate and, together with hieromonk Arsenie Papacioc, escaped to the Stanisoara Mountains. He was brought back to the monastery after two years upon Patriarch Justinian's order.

In 1956 he returned to Sihastria monastery, where he had been anointed, and in the spring of 1959 he retired for the third time to the Neamț Mountains, spending the next five years there. He returned to Sihastria in the fall of 1964, as confessor for the entire community and continued to give spiritual advice to both monks and lay people for the next 34 years. 
He died on 2 December 1998 at Sihăstria Monastery.

Reputation
He was a strong defender of the traditional Orthodox lifestyle and had a strong influence over later developments in the Romanian Orthodox church. The current patriarch, Daniel, was one of his disciples along with other current bishops. He would always portray himself as a worthless person and consistently diminished his deeds and suffering during his life.

He claimed that while in seclusion in the mountains he lived as a king even though the conditions were extremely severe, food was scarce and shelter was improvised. His views on the importance of ecology and the responsibility of man to love and uphold the natural world as the creation of God went a long way ensuring the involvement of the Romanian Church in embracing ecologist views.

He was often sought after for advice by various important persons such as politicians and businessmen which he received together with common folk. He preached meekness and thorough understanding of the Bible and Holy tradition.

It is through his meekness despite his vast power of influencing the church, as well as his vast knowledge, that made from him an emblem of the church revival after the 1989 Revolution.

Published work
Despre credinţa ortodoxă ("About Orthodox Faith", Bucuresti, 1981, 280 pages, republished in 1985, then in Galaţi under the title: Călăuza în credinţa ortodoxă, "Guide to the Orthodox Faith", 1991, 276 pages);
Predici la praznice împărăteşti şi sfinti de peste an ("Sermons on Religious Feasts and Saints Over the Year", Ed. Episcopiei Romanului, 1986, 440 pages);
Predici la Duminicile de peste an (Sermons on Sundays Over the Year, Ed. Episcopiei Romanului, 1990, 560 pages);
Valoarea sufletului (Value of the Soul, Galaţi, 1991, 176 pages, republished in Bacău, 1994, 238 pages);
Urcuş spre înviere (predici duhovniceşti) ("Ascent Towards Resurrection (Spiritual Sermons)", Mănăstirea Neamţ, 1992, 416 pages);
Despre vise şi vedenii ("About Dreams and Visions", București, 1993, 270 pages);
Numerous articles in different magazines and newspapers, sermons in manuscript

Studies 
 Balan, I., Archim. Elder Cleopa of Sihastria: In the Tradition of Saint Paisius Velichkovsky. Lake George (CO), 2001. 
 Stebbing, N. Bearers of the Spirit: Spiritual Fatherhood in Romanian Orthodoxy. Collegeville, MN, 2003 (Cistercian Studies Series).

External links
 
 Short biography (in Romanian)
 Detailed biographical information in English 
 Photos & some biographical information in English
 

1912 births
1998 deaths
People from Botoșani County
Romanian Orthodox monks
Romanian abbots